Larissa Drekonja is a Slovenian American actress. Her breakthrough role was as Galina on NBC TV show Windfall in 2006. She has appeared on other films and TV shows since.

External links

American television actresses
Living people
Year of birth missing (living people)
21st-century American actresses
American film actresses